Daniel Robert Fleck (October 23, 1949 – March 3, 2011) was a Republican member of the Pennsylvania House of Representatives.
 He died of cancer in 2011.

References

Republican Party members of the Pennsylvania House of Representatives
2011 deaths
1949 births
People from Oxnard, California
People from Butler, Pennsylvania